Frederick Sylvester North Douglas (8 February 1791 – 21 October 1819)  was an English actuary and politician.

He was the oldest son of Sylvester Douglas, 1st Baron Glenbervie, and his wife Lady Catherine Anne North, daughter of Frederick North, 2nd Earl of Guilford.

He was educated at Westminster School, Christ Church, Oxford, and at Lincoln's Inn, before setting off on a grand tour from 1810 to 1812. On his return he wrote An Essay on Certain Points of Resemblance Between the Ancient and Modern Greeks.

He was elected at the 1812 general election as the Member of Parliament (MP) for Banbury, holding the seat until his death in 1819, aged 28.

He was elected a Fellow of the Royal Society in 1817.

Works

References

External links 
 
 

1791 births
1819 deaths
People educated at Westminster School, London
Alumni of Christ Church, Oxford
Members of Lincoln's Inn
Members of the Parliament of the United Kingdom for English constituencies
UK MPs 1812–1818
UK MPs 1818–1820
Heirs apparent who never acceded
Eldest sons of British hereditary barons
English non-fiction writers
English male non-fiction writers
Fellows of the Royal Society